Żebrowski (feminine: Żebrowska; plural: Żebrowscy) is a Polish locational surname, which means a person from a place called Żebro or Żebry in Poland. The name may refer to:

Dawid Żebrowski (born 1997), Polish athlete
Elżbieta Żebrowska (born 1945), Polish athlete
Gary Zebrowski (born 1984), French snowboarder
George Zebrowski (born 1945), American writer
Gerhard Zebrowski (born 1940), German footballer
Henry Zebrowski (born 1984), American actor and comedian
Izabela Żebrowska Kowalińska (born 1985), Polish volleyball player
Kazimierz Żebrowski (1891-c. 1945), Polish ice hockey player
Kenneth Zebrowski (1946–2007), American politician
Kenneth Zebrowski, Jr. (born 1980), American politician
Marcin Żebrowski, Polish television presenter
Michał Żebrowski (born 1972), Polish actor
Thomas Zebrowski (1714–1758), Lithuanian architect and scientist
Walenty Żebrowski (died 1764), Polish painter

References

See also
 
 

Polish-language surnames